Auguste Joseph André "Josy" Koelsch (5 October 1926 – 30 August 1985) was a French sprint canoer who competed in the early 1950s. He finished 13th in the K-2 10000 m event at the 1952 Summer Olympics in Helsinki.

References

Josy Koelsch's profile at Sports Reference.com

1926 births
Canoeists at the 1952 Summer Olympics
French male canoeists
Olympic canoeists of France
1985 deaths